Charles Williams (born June 2, 1962) is an American former professional boxer who competed from 1978 to 1996, holding the IBF light heavyweight title from 1987 to 1993.

Career
Born in Columbus, Ohio, Williams was known as "Prince" Charles and turned pro in 1978. He lost his pro debut against former Olympic boxer Henry Bunch. However, in 1987 he captured the IBF light heavyweight title by stopping Bobby Czyz in Las Vegas. He defended the title against eight boxers before losing the title to Henry Maske in 1993. In 1994 he moved down to Super Middleweight to take on IBF super middleweight title holder James Toney, but he was KO'd in the 12th round. He retired in 1996.

Professional boxing record

See also 
 List of IBF world champions

References

External links 
 

|-

 

1962 births
International Boxing Federation champions
Living people
American male boxers
Light-heavyweight boxers
World light-heavyweight boxing champions